The Pukao Seamount is a submarine volcano, the most westerly in the Easter Seamount Chain or Sala y Gómez ridge. To the east are Moai (seamount) and then Easter Island. It rises over 2,500 metres from the ocean floor to within a few hundred metres of the sea surface. The Pukao Seamount is fairly young, and believed to have developed in the last few hundred thousand years as the Nazca Plate floats over the Easter hotspot.

See also
 Easter Island
 Sala y Gómez

References

Submarine volcanoes
Seamounts of the Pacific Ocean
Hotspot volcanoes
Pleistocene
Volcanoes of Chile